Strobisia proserpinella is a moth of the family Gelechiidae. It was described by Frey and Boll in 1878. It is found in North America, where it has been recorded from Missouri and Texas.

References

Moths described in 1878
Strobisia